Dennis Forwood Vosper, Baron Runcorn TD PC (2 January 1916 – 20 January 1968) was a British Conservative Party politician.

Educated at The Leas, Hoylake, Marlborough College and at Pembroke College, Cambridge, he first worked with Wilson, Vosper & Coltart, Ships Store & Export Merchants, in Liverpool. He was commissioned into the Cheshire Regiment (Territorial Army) in April 1939 and served until the 1950s, reaching the rank of Major.

He was elected as the Member of Parliament (MP) for Runcorn, Cheshire in 1950, holding the seat until 1964.

He held office as Conservative Whip, 1950–1954; as a Lord Commissioner of the Treasury, 1951–1954; Parliamentary Secretary to the Ministry of Education, October 1954 – January 1957; Minister of Health, 1957, from which he resigned owing to illness in September 1957. He was Leader of the Parliamentary Delegation to West Indies, 1958. He returned to ministerial office as Joint Parliamentary Under-Secretary of State for the Home Department, 1959–1960, as Minister of State for Home Affairs, 1960–1961; and as Secretary for Technical Co-operation, 1961–1963.

He was appointed a Privy Counsellor in 1957 and was created a life peer on 20 April 1964 as Baron Runcorn, of Heswall in the County Palatine of Chester.

He died in January 1968 aged 52.

Arms

References

1916 births
1968 deaths
Alumni of Pembroke College, Cambridge
British Army personnel of World War II
Cheshire Regiment officers
Conservative Party (UK) MPs for English constituencies
Runcorn
Members of the Privy Council of the United Kingdom
Ministers in the Eden government, 1955–1957
Ministers in the Macmillan and Douglas-Home governments, 1957–1964
Ministers in the third Churchill government, 1951–1955
People educated at Marlborough College
UK MPs 1950–1951
UK MPs 1951–1955
UK MPs 1955–1959
UK MPs 1959–1964
UK MPs who were granted peerages
Life peers created by Elizabeth II